Flint Town is an eight episode American documentary television series that was released on Netflix on March 2, 2018. The documentary focuses on the thoughts and conflicted emotions of police officers serving to protect urban areas of Flint, Michigan (unofficially nicknamed "Flint Town") struggling with poverty, crime, financially strapped public services and the Flint water crisis. The series covers a period from November 2015 to early 2017, the same time frame as the 2016 presidential election. The department captured on-screen is down from 300 officers to 98 for 100,000 people, the lowest number out of comparably sized cities. Over the course of the episodes, the police faced a crucial millage vote and a city government wrangling over funding.

Cast
Bridgette Balasko – police officer; later officer, CATT (Crime Area Target Team) squad; aspires to be a Federal Investigator; later Homicide Detective
Devon Bernritter – Captain
John Boismier – K-9 Officer
Esther Campbell – Sergeant
Hillary Clinton – Democratic Presidential Candidate
Jessica Dupnack – ABC12 News Reporter
Robert Frost – Sergeant
Timothy Johnson – Chief of Police, appointed by Mayor Karen Weaver
Dion Reed – LERTA Cadet turned police officer, son of Maria
Maria Reed – LERTA Cadet turned police officer, mother of Dion
Bernie Sanders – Democratic Presidential Candidate
Bill Schuette - Michigan Attorney General
Lewis Spears – Police Reserve Volunteer
James Tolbert – former Chief of Police, fired by Mayor Karen Weaver
Donald Trump – 45th President of The United States of America
Jazmin Tuttle – fiancé of Dion Reed
Keith Urquhart – Sergeant, CATT squad
Scott Watson – officer, CATT squad
Karen Weaver – Newly elected Mayor of Flint
James Wheeler – Field Training Officer
Brian Willingham – police officer

Episodes

See also
 Decline of Detroit

References

External links
Flint Town on Netflix

Netflix original documentary television series
2010s American documentary television series
2018 American television series debuts
2018 American television series endings
English-language Netflix original programming
Television series by Anonymous Content